James Bernard may refer to:

James Bernard (composer) (1925–2001), British composer
James Bernard (elocutionist) (1874–1946), British elocutionist
James Bernard (politician) (1729–1790), Irish MP for Cork County
James Bernard, 4th Earl of Bandon (1850–1924), Irish representative peer and Lord Lieutenant of Cork
James Bernard, 2nd Earl of Bandon (1785–1856)